Samuel Peter Walsh (born 2 July 2000) is a professional Australian rules footballer playing for the Carlton Football Club in the Australian Football League (AFL). He was awarded the 2019 NAB Rising Star Award. He was drafted by Carlton with their first selection which was also the first overall in the 2018 national draft.

Early life
Walsh played his junior football for Ocean Grove, before playing under-18s football with the Geelong Falcons, in the then-named TAC Cup. He impressed massively and was touted as a sure-fire number 1 draft pick. Sam Walsh averaged an astounding 32 disposals a game as their co-captain, which bolstered his draft stock. Labelled as the 'best pure midfielder in the draft', Walsh also played in the NAB Under 18 Championships, where he represented Vic Country as captain. He amassed an average of 29 disposals in the tournament, and also won the Larke Medal as the best player in the competition. 

He completed high school at St Joseph's College, Geelong in 2018.

AFL career
At the 2018 National Draft, Walsh was drafted number 1 by the Carlton Football Club. This was not seen as a surprise to many, who had expected him to be a lock for the first pick. Walsh was given the number 18 and impressed many during pre-season. Sam made his debut in Round 1 of the 2019 AFL season against  at the MCG, where he finished with 24 disposals. He kicked his first goal against  in round 3.

He also earned a contract extension with the Blues, keeping him at the club until 2022.
Sam was awarded with the 2019 AFL rising star.

After a promising season in 2020, which culminated in his finishing second in the Carlton Best and Fairest, Walsh exploded in season 2021, garnering his maiden All Australian selection, his first John Nicholls Medal as the Carlton Football Club Best and Fairest, and finishing fourth in the Brownlow Medal.

In February 2022, Walsh signed a 4 year extension to stay with the Blues until at least the end of 2026.

Statistics
 'Statistics are correct to the end of Round 23 2021.

|- style="background-color: #EAEAEA"
! scope="row" style="text-align:center" | 2019
|
| 18 || 22 || 6 || 13 || 297 || 257 || 554 || 113 || 69 || 0.3 || 0.6 || 13.5 || 11.7 || 25.2 || 5.1 || 3.1 || 6
|-
! scope="row" style="text-align:center" | 2020
|
| 18 || 17 || 8 || 4 || 193 || 156 || 349 || 73 || 47 || 0.5 || 0.2 || 11.3 || 9.2 || 20.5 || 4.3 || 2.8 || 8
|- style="background-color: #EAEAEA"
! scope="row" style="text-align:center" | 2021
|
| 18 || 22 || 12 || 6 || 298 || 358	|| 656 || 127 || 100 || 0.6 || 0.3 || 13.6 || 16.3 || 29.8 || 5.8 || 4.6 || 30
|- class="sortbottom"
! colspan=3| Career
! 61	
! 26
! 23
! 788	
! 313
! 1559
! 313	
! 216	
! 0.4
! 0.4
! 12.9
! 12.6
! 25.6
! 5.1
! 3.5
! 44
|}

References

External links

Geelong Falcons players
2000 births
Living people
Carlton Football Club players
Australian rules footballers from Victoria (Australia)
AFL Rising Star winners